Anatoliy Dimov (born 26 February 1956) is a former Soviet steeplechase runner. He competed in the men's 3000 metres steeplechase at the 1980 Summer Olympics.

References

1956 births
Living people
Athletes (track and field) at the 1980 Summer Olympics
Soviet male steeplechase runners
Olympic athletes of the Soviet Union
Place of birth missing (living people)